Mascom Wireless Proprietary Limited, is a Botswana mobile telecommunications company. Its head office is in Gaborone. It was established in Gaborone, Botswana on February 17, 1998.

History 
The company was first licensed on 17 February 1998. It was founded by Strive Masiyiwa.

Until 2003, Portugal Telecom owned a controlling stake in the company. In 2005, MTN Group purchased a 44% stake in Mascom for $128 million.

In 2016, Dzene Makhwade-Seboni was appointed Chief Operations Officer and became CEO of the company in 2019.

It provides the widest coverage in Botswana, reaching over 95% of the population.

Services

Internet 
Mascom offers users mobile internet via EDGE, 3G, 4G and 4.5G, 4G wingle. Mascom also offer internet service via FTTH (Fiber To The Home). On the 25th of February 2022, Mascom has been the first mobile telecommunication to introduce 5G on four different places around Gaborone.

Gallery of the WTISD 2017 Masunga, North East District

See also
 Mobile telephony in Africa
 Telephone numbers in Botswana

References

External links

Telecommunications companies of Botswana
Telecommunications companies established in 1998
Internet service providers of Botswana